The 2007 edition of the women's basketball tournament of the African Games was the 9th, organized by FIBA Africa and played under the auspices of FIBA, the basketball sport governing body. The tournament was held from 12 to 22 July 2007 in Algiers, Algeria, contested by 11 national teams and won by Senegal, who defeated Nigeria 60–46 in the final to win their sixth title.

Squads

Draw

Preliminary round
Times given below are in UTC+1.

Group A

Group B

Knockout stage

Championship bracket

Quarterfinals

Semifinals

Bronze medal match

Final

5–8th place bracket

5–8th place classification

7th place match

5th place match

9th place match

Final standings

Awards

All-Tournament Team

Statistical Leaders

Individual Tournament Highs

Points per Game

Rebounds

Assists

2-point field goal percentage

3-point field goal percentage

Free throw percentage

Team Tournament Highs

Points per Game

Rebounds

Assists

2-point field goal percentage

3-point field goal percentage

Free throw percentage

See also
2007 FIBA Africa Championship for Women

References

 
Basketball at the African Games – Women's tournament
Women's
International women's basketball competitions hosted by Algeria
2007 in women's basketball